Rooihuiskraal is a residential suburb on the southern outskirts of Centurion, Gauteng, South Africa.

References

Suburbs of Centurion, Gauteng